The 2020 Utah gubernatorial election was held on November 3, 2020, to elect the governor of Utah, concurrently with the 2020 U.S. presidential election, as well as elections to the United States Senate and elections to the United States House of Representatives and various state and local elections. Although incumbent Republican Governor Gary Herbert was eligible to run for re-election to a third full term, he initially announced shortly after being re-elected in 2016 that he would not run again, but indicated in January 2019 that he was open to the possibility of running again before ultimately deciding to retire and endorse his lieutenant governor, Spencer Cox. Utah has not had a Democratic governor since Scott M. Matheson left office in January 1985. This is the second longest active streak of one-party leadership, trailing only South Dakota, which has not had a Democratic governor since Harvey L. Wollman left office in 1979.

The winner of the election was the first non-incumbent gubernatorial candidate to be elected since Jon Huntsman Jr. in 2004, who ran in this election before he was eliminated in the primaries. The primaries took place on June 30, 2020. The filing deadline was on June 19, 2020.

Lieutenant Governor Spencer Cox won the general election by defeating the Democratic nominee, University of Utah law professor and former CFPB official Christopher Peterson.

Republican primary

Candidates

Nominee
 Spencer Cox, Lieutenant Governor of Utah
Running mate: Deidre Henderson, state senator and candidate for UT-03 in 2017

Eliminated in the primary
Greg Hughes, former Speaker of the Utah House of Representatives
 Running mate: Victor Iverson, Washington County Commission Chairman
Jon Huntsman Jr., former United States Ambassador to Russia, China and Singapore, former Governor of Utah
Running mate: Michelle Kaufusi, Mayor of Provo
Thomas Wright, Republican National Committee executive committee member and former Chair of the Utah Republican Party
Running mate: Rob Bishop, U.S. Representative for Utah's 1st congressional district and former Speaker of the Utah House of Representatives

Eliminated at the convention
Jeff Burningham, businessman
Running mate: Dan McCay, state senator
Jason Christensen, activist
Running mate: Drew Chamberlain
Jan Garbett, businesswoman
Running mate: Joseph Jarvis, physician and small business owner
Aimee Winder Newton, Salt Lake County councilwoman (Endorsed Cox)
Running mate: John Dougall, Utah State Auditor

Declined
Rob Bishop, U.S. Representative (endorsed Wright, who in turn chose Bishop to run with him as his lieutenant governor)
Jason Chaffetz, former U.S. Representative
John Dougall, Utah State Auditor
Gary Herbert, incumbent Governor (endorsed Cox)
Mike Lee, U.S. Senator
Greg Miller, former CEO of the Utah Jazz
Sean Reyes, Attorney General of Utah
Josh Romney, real estate developer and son of Mitt Romney

Endorsements

Polling

Convention results

Primary results

Democratic primary

Candidates

Nominee
Christopher Peterson, University of Utah law professor and former CFPB official
Running mate: Karina Brown, community organizer

Eliminated at the convention
Neil Hansen, former state representative
Running mate: Brandy Farmer, candidate for Utah House of Representatives
Ryan Jackson
Zachary Moses, CEO of HeTravel.com
Running mate: Nate Kizerian, community activist
Nikki Pino Jr., youth counselor
Running mate: Nikki Pino Sr., retired Army lieutenant colonel and father to Nikki Pino Jr.
Archie A Williams, 2014 Democratic candidate for District 60 of the Utah House of Representatives III

Declined
Peter Corroon, former Utah Democratic Party chair, former mayor of Salt Lake County, and nominee for governor in 2010
Scott Howell, former state senator and nominee for U.S. Senate in 2000 and 2012
Patricia W. Jones, former state senator
Brian King, minority leader of the Utah House of Representatives  (endorsed Peterson)
Jim Matheson, former U.S. Representative
Ben McAdams, U.S. Representative (running for re-election)
Peter Metcalf, former CEO of Black Diamond Equipment
Paul Rolly, former columnist for The Salt Lake Tribune
Jim Winder, former Salt Lake County Sheriff

Polling

Convention results

Other candidates

Independent American Party

Nominee 
 Gregory Duerden,
 Wayne Hill, Vice Chair of the Utah Independent American Party

Libertarian Party

Nominee 
 Daniel Cottam, Bariatric Surgeon
 Running Mate: Barry Short, businessman and Vice Chair of the Libertarian Party of Utah

General election

Campaign
An advertisement that featured both major-party candidates, calling for civility in politics, drew significant media coverage and praise.

Predictions

Endorsements

Polling
Graphical summary

Polls

with Spencer Eccles

with only Spencer Cox, Greg Hughes and Jon Huntsman

with Generic Democrat

with Bishop, Chaffetz, Cox, Dougall, Hughes, Miller, Newton, Reyes and Generic Democrat (D)

with Jason Chaffetz, Spencer Cox, Spencer Eccles, Greg Hughes, Ben McAdams, Greg Miller and Josh Romney

Results

 

Counties that flipped from Republican to Democratic
 Grand (largest municipality: Moab)

Notes 
 Additional candidates

 General

References

External links 
Official campaign websites
 Daniel Cottam (L) for Governor
 Spencer Cox (R) for Governor
 Gregory Duerden (IAP) for Governor
 Christopher Peterson (D) for Governor 

Utah
2020
Governor